New Town Plaza is a modern center having fountains, laser light-show and clock. The center is situated at Action Area 1, New Town (few meters away from Home Town & Axis Mall).

Architecture and design
The design and architecture of the place is unique in Kolkata.

See also
HIDCO

Gallery

External links

  New Town Kolkata Development Authority

Tourist attractions in North 24 Parganas district
New Town, Kolkata